At least four ships of the French Navy have borne the name Calypso:

 , launched in 1782 as the slave ship Baron de Binder in 1793 she became the privateer Duguay-Trouin. She was requisitioned in 1794 and rated as a corvette being renamed Calypso in 1795. Returned to her owners in 1797 and captured by the Royal Navy the following year.
 , a  launched in 1807 and sold in 1814
 , a  launched in 1907 and sunk in 1914
 , a  launched in 1926 and sunk in 1943

French Navy ship names